The Gander (also called Altbach in France) is a river which flows in Luxembourg and in the French département Moselle, tributary of the river Moselle (left side). Its source is in the commune of Frisange, southern Luxembourg. It flows generally southeast, and from Altwies until Emerange (commune of Burmerange) it forms the French-Luxembourgish border. From Emerange until its outflow into the Moselle at Haute-Kontz, it flows through France. The largest town on the Gander is Mondorf-les-Bains.

References

Rivers of France
Rivers of Moselle (department)
Rivers of Luxembourg
France–Luxembourg border
International rivers of Europe
Rivers of Grand Est
Border rivers